Glipostenoda amamiana is a species of beetle in the genus Glipostenoda. It was described in 1928.

References

aka
Beetles described in 1928